Events from the year 1912 in Canada.

Incumbents

Crown 
 Monarch – George V

Federal government 
 Governor General – Prince Arthur, Duke of Connaught and Strathearn
 Prime Minister – Robert Borden
 Chief Justice – Charles Fitzpatrick (Quebec) 
 Parliament – 12th

Provincial governments

Lieutenant governors 
Lieutenant Governor of Alberta – George Hedley Vicars Bulyea 
Lieutenant Governor of British Columbia – Thomas Wilson Paterson
Lieutenant Governor of Manitoba – Douglas Colin Cameron
Lieutenant Governor of New Brunswick – Lemuel John Tweedie (until March 6) then Josiah Wood 
Lieutenant Governor of Nova Scotia – James Drummond McGregor
Lieutenant Governor of Ontario – John Morison Gibson
Lieutenant Governor of Prince Edward Island – Benjamin Rogers 
Lieutenant Governor of Quebec – François Langelier
Lieutenant Governor of Saskatchewan – George William Brown

Premiers 
Premier of Alberta – Arthur Sifton
Premier of British Columbia – Richard McBride
Premier of Manitoba – Rodmond Roblin
Premier of New Brunswick – James Kidd Flemming
Premier of Nova Scotia – George Henry Murray 
Premier of Ontario – James Whitney
Premier of Prince Edward Island – John Mathieson
Premier of Quebec – Lomer Gouin
Premier of Saskatchewan – Thomas Walter Scott

Territorial governments

Commissioners 
 Commissioner of Yukon – Arthur Wilson (acting) (until February 1) then George Black 
 Gold Commissioner of Yukon – F.X. Gosselin (until February 1) then George P. MacKenzie 
 Commissioner of Northwest Territories – Frederick D. White

Events
February 1 – Strathcona merges with Edmonton, Alberta
April 1 – The Parliament of Canada passes Quebec Boundaries Extension Act that transferred to the Province of Quebec the territory bounded by the Eastmain River, the Labrador coast, and Hudson and Ungava Bays, extending the northern boundary to its present location.
April 14/15 – The RMS Titanic strikes an iceberg off the Grand Banks of Newfoundland
April 26 – The Chateau Laurier opens in Ottawa
May 14 – Manitoba, Ontario, and Quebec expand to the north
June 30 – A tornado (the "Regina Cyclone") kills 28.
August 14 – 1912 Saskatchewan general election: Walter Scott's Liberals win a third consecutive majority
August 17 – Circular No. 17 bans the teaching of the French language in Ontario schools.
ca. December – The first session of the Saskatchewan Older Boys' Parliament (now the Saskatchewan Youth Parliament) is held. This was a precursor to the current Canadian youth parliament movement.
The Amherst automobile company opens, and closes, in Calgary.

Sport 

January 2 – New Westminster Royals defeat the Victoria Senators in the 1st Pacific Coast Hockey Association game played at Victoria's Patrick Arena
March 2 – Quebec Bulldogs win the National Hockey Association's Stanley Cup
March 19 – New Westminster Royals win the first PCHA Championship, However the Royals were not able to challenge the Quebec Bulldogs in the Stanley Cup due to finishing too late for the East
September 2 – The first Calgary Stampede is held
November 30 – The Hamilton Alerts defeated the Toronto Argonauts 11 to 4 in the 4th Grey Cup played at Hamilton's A.A.A. Grounds

Arts and literature

Births

January to March
January 2 – Barbara Pentland, composer (d.2000)
January 3 – Louise Lapointe, senator (d. 2002)
February 4 – Louis-Albert Vachon, educator and Cardinal of the Roman Catholic Church (d.2006)
March 12 – Irving Layton, poet (d.2006)
March 22 – Agnes Martin, painter (d.2004)
March 30 – Alvin Hamilton, politician (d.2004)

April to June
April 2 – John Marlyn, writer (d.2005)
April 26 – A. E. van Vogt, science fiction author (d.2000)
May 5 – Louis-René Beaudoin, politician and Speaker of the House of Commons of Canada (d.1970)
May 8 – George Woodcock, poet, essayist, critic, biographer and historian (d.1995)
May 13 – Gil Evans, jazz pianist, arranger, composer and bandleader (d.1988)
May 17 – George Brown, ice hockey player
May 26 – Jay Silverheels, actor (d.1980)
June 8 – Clyde Gilmour, radio broadcaster and journalist (d.1997)
June 10 
Bill Kardash, politician (d.1997)
Jean Lesage, lawyer, politician and Premier of Quebec (d.1980)
June 11 – Keith R. Porter, biologist and academic (d. 1997)

July to December
July 12 
René Bégin, politician (d.1980)
Gustave Blouin, politician (d.2002)
 
July 14 – Northrop Frye, literary critic and literary theorist (d.1991)
July 17 – Art Linkletter, television personality (d.2010)
August 21 – Hugh Alexander Bryson, politician (d.1987)
September 21 – Kenneth MacLean Glazier, Sr., minister and librarian (d.1989)
October 5 – Bora Laskin, jurist and 14th Chief Justice of Canada (d.1984)
October 25
Jack Kent Cooke, sports entrepreneur (d.1997)
Jean Wallbridge, architect
October 31 – Graham Westbrook Rowley, arctic explorer (d. 2003)
November 8 – June Havoc, actress (d.2010)
November 16 – Richard Spink Bowles, lawyer and Lieutenant Governor of Manitoba (d.1988)
December 27 – Steve Peters, politician (d.1976)

Full date unknown
Clarence Gosse, physician and Lieutenant Governor of Nova Scotia (d.1996)

Deaths

January to June
January 18 – George Ralph Richardson Cockburn, educator and politician (b.1834)
March 1 
 Louis Babel, priest (b. 1826)
 Edward Blake, politician and 2nd Premier of Ontario (b.1833)
March 21 –Andrew Archibald Macdonald, Lieutenant Governor of Prince Edward Island (b. 1829)
April 15 – Charles Melville Hays, railway executive (b.1856)
May 5 – Charles Constantine, North-West Mounted Police officer and superintendent (b.1849)

July to December
August 9 – George Blewett, academic and philosopher (b.1873)
August 12 – Timothy Coughlin, farmer and politician (b.1834)
September 24 – Sir Richard Cartwright, businessman, politician and Minister (b.1835)
October 30 – Adam Carr Bell, politician, Leader of the Opposition of Nova Scotia (b. 1847)
November 10 – Louis Cyr, strongman (b.1863)
November 26 – Lemuel Owen, shipbuilder, banker, merchant, politician and Premier of Prince Edward Island (b.1822)
December 23 – Benjamin Allen, politician (b.1830)

Historical documents
Residential school principal advocates replacing it with day school to preserve family ties and love that staff cannot provide

People of Gitxsan community Gitsegukla (B.C.) raise funds to pay their pastor's hospital bill

Pauline Johnson hears from old klootchman how Fraser River sockeye salmon run once failed because tillicum insisted great tyee's first child be male

Appeal for justice from speaker who asks why Sikhs - British subjects - are discriminated against in Canada

Advice to Ontario temperance campaigners on legislative, economic, criminal and personal aspects of liquor consumption

Federal Liberal Party claims false arrest of party workers aided Conservative win in Manitoba by-election

Provincial forest fire law in British Columbia has several sections regulating railways (construction, clearing and patrolling, fighting fires, etc.)

British architect and builder express importance of community over private interest in Calgary town planning

Advertisement: Canadian Pacific Railway's free "Canada for Women" pamphlet describes "opportunities for women in Canada in every branch of life"

"Cargo on the main deck was not secured" - Enquiry seeks reasons Cecilia L. wrecked when storm struck on Lake Saint-Louis

Visitor sees huge change in Edmonton just six years after previous visit

Careful preparation of straightaway at Calgary's Gridiron Motor Course results in world speed record claim

Finding and preserving duckbilled dinosaur fossil near Drumheller, Alberta

References 

 
Years of the 20th century in Canada
Canada
Canada